Ciudad Perdida (Spanish for "lost city"; also known as Teyuna and Buritaca-200) is the archaeological site of an ancient city in the Sierra Nevada de Santa Marta of Colombia, within the jurisdiction of the city of Santa Marta. This city is believed to have been founded about 800 CE. If so, Ciudad Perdida predates Machu Picchu by about 650 years. 

Ciudad Perdida consists of a series of 169 terraces carved into the mountainside, a network of tiled roads, and several small circular plazas. The entrance can be accessed only by climbing up 1,200 stone steps through dense jungle.

Modern discovery
Ciudad Perdida was discovered in 1972 by Los Sepúlvedas, a group of local treasure looters. They made one of the greatest archaeological discoveries in modern times.

Los Sepúlvedas were a small family of looters living in Colombia. The family often went hunting in the forests, and one day they shot a wild turkey. While retrieving the turkey, they noticed it had fallen on a series of stone steps rising up the mountainside. They climbed up the stone steps and discovered an abandoned city, which they named "Green Hell" or "Wide Set". After the murder of one of the Sepúlveda sons at the site of Ciudad Perdida, fights broke out among the looters. 

Soon after, gold figures and ceramic urns from Ciudad Perdida began to appear on the local black market. This alerted archaeologists, and a team led by the director of the Instituto Colombiano de Antropología, reached the site in 1976. The site was reconstructed between 1976 and 1982.

Although La Ciudad Perdida is an impressive site, it is not the only one of its kind. Only about 30–40% of the sites in the Sierra Nevada region have been explored. However, thanks to recent widespread lidar access, more and more of these sites are being discovered.

Members of local tribes – notably the Kogi people – have stated that they visited the site of Ciudad Perdida regularly before it was widely reported, but had kept quiet about it. They call the city "Teyuna" and believe it was the heart of a network of villages inhabited by their forebears, the Tairona.

History

The site was originally inhabited by the Tairona people. According to the Kogi people, who are some of the last preserved indigenous descendants of the Tairona, the Tairona lived for thousands of years, up until the age of the Spanish conquistadors.

The Tairona people were forced to flee from La Ciudad Perdida sometime in the 16th century, after years of trade and conflict.

Indigenous tribes 

Indigenous peoples had established advanced communities 1,500 years before the Spanish arrived. These communities were connected by stone paths, which facilitated the exchange of food and products made of gold, stone, and clay. The inhabitants took advantage of the rich variety of foods and resources available in this mountainous region near the sea. They had gardens to grow vegetables such as tomatoes and corn, and fruits such as avocado, guanabana, pineapple, and guava. Due to their close proximity to the ocean, they obtained a large variety of seafood. The indigenous children learned the stories and legends from their elders and were taught how to create fabrics to make their clothes and mochilas. Children and adults admired the warriors who successfully protected the indigenous people from the Spanish conquerors.

Although they are generally referred to as the "Tairona people", there were many groups and settlements spread across the mountains and beaches in distinct, smaller communities (polities) all trading and working together. When the Spanish landed on their territory in 1514, the conquistador took out his declaration and read,

The Tairona people were strong warriors and resisted the oppression of the conquistadors for nearly a century. For many years after the Spanish arrived on their shores, the Tairona were able to hold their ground despite violent treatment from Europeans. The Tairona people, much like the Kogi people today, were not violent people. The Kogi believe in kindness and equality. The Tairona people lived to protect and serve the earth, not only for themselves but for everyone.

As the European colonizers settled in indigenous territory, they began enslaving the natives who fished and collected salt on the coast. The Tairona people in the mountains, dependent on the fish and salt farmed by the coastal Tairona people, told escaped enslaved Tairona members to return and bring the Europeans gifts of gold to appease them. The Europeans took the gold but were not appeased and became more hostile to the natives. The Tairona resisted the conquistadors for many years (the exact number of years is unknown) but were eventually forced to flee in the 1500s.

The effects of the conquistador's colonization of their villages are still seen today. As the years passed, the Europeans took more and more of the gold originally crafted by the indigenous people. Much of that gold still resides in museums across Europe, leaving the current descendant tribes of today—the Kogi, Arsarios, Arhuacos, Kankwamos, and Chimilas—without any of the gold of their ancestors.

The Kogi people live in the last pre-Columbian settlement and have more-or-less kept the ways of the Tairona people since they were forced out of their settlements by the conquistadors. Although the Kogi can provide insight into the Tairona, it is important to remember that they are distinct from the people who lived 500 years ago. The Kogi people believe that everything buried in La Ciudad Perdida contributes to the peace, harmony, and balance of the world. After teaching one of their members Spanish, they presented this case to the Colombian government and successfully reclaimed the rights to their ancestral land. Now, groups like the Global Heritage Fund continuously work to protect the historic site against, as the Kogi people would say, "younger brother's" harm.

Armed conflict
The area around Cuidad Perdida was affected by the Colombian armed conflict between the Colombian National Army, right-wing paramilitary groups, and left-wing guerrilla groups like the National Liberation Army (ELN) and Revolutionary Armed Forces of Colombia (FARC).

On 15 September 2003, the ELN kidnapped eight foreign tourists visiting Ciudad Perdida, demanding a government investigation into human rights abuses in exchange for their hostages. The ELN released the last of the hostages three months later. The United Self-Defense Forces of Colombia (paramilitary right-wing groups) continued attacking aborigines and non-aborigines in the zone for a while.

The area has been free of incidents for some time, and is now completely safe.

Resumed access
In 2005, tourist hikes became operational again and there have been no problems since then. The Colombian Army actively patrols the area, which is now deemed to be safe for visitors, and there have not been any more kidnappings.

Since 2009, the non-profit organization Global Heritage Fund (GHF) has been working in Ciudad Perdida to preserve and protect the historic site against climate, vegetation, neglect, looting, and unsustainable tourism. GHF's stated goals include the development and implementation of a regional management plan, documentation and conservation of the archaeological features at Ciudad Perdida, and engagement of the local indigenous communities as major stakeholders in the preservation and sustainable development of the site.

For a 4-day hike to the lost city, the cost is approximately US$334, a fixed-price arranged by the communities that inhabit the surroundings of the trail.
It is a moderately difficult hike: The hike is about 44 km of walking in total and requires a good level of fitness. The hike includes several river crossings and steep climbs and descents.

Gallery

References

External links

 
https://archive.archaeology.org/0409/abstracts/colombia.html
Lost City – Sierra Nevada de Santa Marta

Archaeological sites in Colombia
Tourist attractions in Magdalena Department
Former populated places in Colombia
1972 archaeological discoveries
World Heritage Tentative List for Colombia